Nikoletta Lakos (born December 14, 1978, in Budapest, Hungary) is a Hungarian chess woman grandmaster. She is a three-time Hungarian Chess Championship winner, having taken the title in 1997, 2002 and 2005.

References

External links
 
 

1978 births
Living people
Sportspeople from Budapest
Hungarian female chess players
Chess woman grandmasters